Napier Bay Islands is a group of islands of the Andaman Islands.  It belongs to the South Andaman administrative district, part of the Indian union territory of Andaman and Nicobar Islands.

Geography
The islands are situated north of Shoal Bay.
The northern islands of this group form part of a natural harbour called Port Meadows.

References 

South Andaman district
Archipelagoes of the Andaman and Nicobar Islands
Uninhabited islands of India